Melhania randii is a plant in the mallow family Malvaceae, native to southern Africa. It is named for the English doctor and plant collector R.F. Rand (1856–1937).

Description
Inflorescences are typically one to three-flowered and feature yellow petals.

Distribution and habitat
Melhania randii is native to Malawi, Mozambique, South Africa (Northern Provinces), Eswatini, Tanzania and Zimbabwe. Its numerous habitats include grassland and mountain summits. The discontinuous nature of the species' distribution has resulted in differences in plants from different colonies, such as Transvaal (now Northern Provinces) specimens being generally broader than their Zimbabwe counterparts.

References

randii
Flora of the Northern Provinces
Flora of South Tropical Africa
Flora of Swaziland
Flora of Tanzania
Plants described in 1899
Taxa named by Edmund Gilbert Baker